Jean Gwenaël Dutourd (14 January 192017 January 2011) was a French novelist.

Biography

Dutourd was born in Paris. His mother died when he was seven years old.  At the age of twenty, he was taken prisoner fifteen days after Germany's invasion of France in World War II.  He escaped six weeks later and returned to Paris where he studied philosophy at the Sorbonne. He entered the Resistance and was again arrested in early 1944. He escaped and took part in the Liberation of Paris. He was a candidate for the Democratic Union of Labour (UDT) in the legislative elections of 1967.
 
His first work, Le Complexe de César, appeared in 1946 and received the Prix Stendhal. He was elected to the Académie française on 30 November 1978.  In 1997 he was elected as a member of Serbian Academy of Sciences and Arts in the Department of Language and Literature.

Dutourd died in Paris on 17 January 2011, at the age of 91.

Bibliography

1946  Le Complexe de César  (Gallimard) 
1947  Le Déjeuner du lundi  (Gallimard) 
1947  Galère  (Éd. des Granges-Vieilles) 
1948  L’Arbre  (Gallimard) 
1950  Une tête de chien  (Gallimard) [In English: "A Dog's Head: A Novel" tr. Robin Chancellor (1998)]
1950  Le Petit Don Juan, traité de la séduction  (Robert Laffont) 
1952  Au bon beurre, scènes de la vie sous l'Occupation (Gallimard) [Two titles in English: "The Milky Way" tr. Robin Chancellor (Museum Press, 1955, UK); "The Best Butter" (Simon & Schuster, 1955, US)]
1955  Doucin  (Gallimard) [In English: "Five A.M." tr. Robin Chancellor (Simon & Schuster, 1956)]
1956  Les Taxis de la Marne  (Gallimard) [In English: "The Taxis of the Marne" tr. Harold King (Simon & Schuster, 1957)]
1958  Le Fond et la Forme, essai alphabétique sur la morale et sur le style  (Gallimard) 
1959  Les Dupes  (Gallimard) 
1959  L’Âme sensible  (Gallimard) [In English: "The Man of Sensibility" tr. Robin Chancellor (Simon & Schuster, 1961)]
1960  Le Fond et la Forme, tome II  (Gallimard) 
1963  Rivarol, essai et choix de textes  (Mercure de France) 
1963  Les Horreurs de l’amour  (Gallimard) [In English: "The Horrors of Love" tr. Robin Chancellor (Doubleday, 1967)]
1964  La Fin des Peaux-Rouges  (Gallimard) [In English: "The Last of the Redskins" tr. Grace T. Mayes (Doubleday, 1965)]
1965  Le Demi-Solde  (Gallimard) 
1965  Le Fond et la Forme, tome III  (Gallimard) 
1967  Pluche ou l’Amour de l’art  (Flammarion) [In English: "Pluche, or The Love of Art" tr. Robin Chancellor (Doubleday, 1970)]
1969  Petit Journal 1965-1966  (Julliard) 
1970  L’École des jocrisses  (Flammarion) 
1971  Le Crépuscule des loups  (Flammarion) 
1971  Le Paradoxe du critique  (Flammarion) 
1972  Le Printemps de la vie  (Flammarion) [In English: "The Springtime of Life" tr. Denver and Helen Lindley (Doubleday, 1974)]
1972  Le Paradoxe du critique, suivi de Sept Saisons  (Flammarion) 
1973  Carnet d’un émigré  (Flammarion) 
1976  2024  (Gallimard) 
1977  Mascareigne  (Julliard) 
1977  Cinq ans chez les sauvages  (Flammarion) 
1978  Les Matinées de Chaillot  (SPL) 
1978  Les Choses comme elles sont  (Stock) 
1979  Œuvres complètes, tome I  (Flammarion) 
1980  Mémoires de Mary Watson  (Flammarion) 
1980  Le Bonheur et autres idées  (Flammarion) 
1981  Un ami qui vous veut du bien  (Flammarion) 
1982  De la France considérée comme une maladie  (Flammarion ) 
1983  Henri ou l’Éducation nationale  (Flammarion) 
1983  Le Socialisme à tête de linotte  (Flammarion) 
1984  Œuvres complètes, tome II  (Flammarion) 
1984  Le Septennat des vaches maigres  (Flammarion) 
1985  Le Mauvais Esprit, entretiens avec J.-É. Hallier  (Olivier Orban) 
1985  La Gauche la plus bête du monde  (Flammarion) 
1986  Conversation avec le Général  (Michèle Trinckvel) 
1986  Contre les dégoûts de la vie  (Flammarion) 
1986  Le Spectre de la rose  (Flammarion) 
1987  Le Séminaire de Bordeaux  (Flammarion) 
1989  Ça bouge dans le prêt à porter  (Flammarion) 
1990  Conversation avec le Général  (Flammarion) 
1990  Loin d’Édimbourg  (Le Fallois) 
1990  Les Pensées  (Le Cherche-Midi) 
1991  Portraits de femmes  (Flammarion) 
1992  Vers de circonstances  (Le Cherche-Midi) 
1993  L’Assassin  (Flammarion) 
1994  Domaine public  (Flammarion) 
1994  Le Vieil Homme et la France  (Flammarion) 
1995  Le Septième Jour, récits des temps bibliques  (Flammarion ) 
1996  Le Feld Maréchal von Bonaparte  (Flammarion) 
1996  Scènes de genre et tableaux d’époque  (Guy Trédaniel) 
1997  Scandale de la vertu  (Le Fallois) 
1997  Trilogie française (Le Séminaire de Bordeaux, Portraits de femmes, l'Assassin)  (Flammarion) 
1997  Journal des années de peste : 1986-1991  (Plon) 
1998  Grand chelem à cœur  (Le Rocher) 
1999  À la recherche du français perdu  (Plon) 
2000  Jeannot, mémoires d’un enfant  (Plon) 
2001  Le Siècle des Lumières éteintes  (Plon) 
2002  Dutouriana  (Plon) 
2004  Journal intime d'un mort  (Plon) 
2006  Les perles et les cochons  (Plon) 
2007 : Leporello (Plon)
2008 : La grenade et le suppositoire (Plon)

Translations

L'Œil d'Apollon, by G. K. Chesterton; Les Muses parlent, by Truman Capote; and Le Vieil Homme et la Mer, by Ernest Hemingway.

References

External links
  L'Académie française

1920 births
2011 deaths
Writers from Paris
Lycée Janson-de-Sailly alumni
Democratic Union of Labour politicians
20th-century French journalists
20th-century French novelists
21st-century French novelists
French male novelists
Members of the Académie Française
Members of the Serbian Academy of Sciences and Arts
Commandeurs of the Ordre des Arts et des Lettres
Commanders of the Ordre national du Mérite
University of Paris alumni
French military personnel of World War II
French Resistance members
Grand Officiers of the Légion d'honneur
Prix Interallié winners
20th-century French male writers
21st-century French male writers
French male non-fiction writers
Burials at Montparnasse Cemetery